German submarine U-637 was a Type VIIC U-boat built for Nazi Germany's Kriegsmarine for service during World War II.
She was laid down on 17 October 1941 by Blohm & Voss, Hamburg as yard number 613, launched on 7 July 1942 and commissioned on 27 August 1942 under Kapitänleutnant Max Bernd Dieterich.

Design
German Type VIIC submarines were preceded by the shorter Type VIIB submarines. U-637 had a displacement of  when at the surface and  while submerged. She had two shafts and two  propellers.

U-637 was fitted with five  torpedo tubes (four fitted at the bow and one at the stern), fourteen torpedoes, one  SK C/35 naval gun, 220 rounds, and one twin  C/30 anti-aircraft gun. The boat had a complement of between forty-four and sixty.

Service history
The boat's career began with training at 5th U-boat Flotilla on 27 August 1942, followed by active service on 1 June 1944 as part of the 1st Flotilla.

In three patrols she sank one warship, for a total of 39 tons.

Fate
U-637 surrendered on 9 May 1945 at Stavanger and later sunk as part of Operation Deadlight on 21 December 1945 at position .

Summary of raiding history

References

Notes

Citations

Bibliography

External links

German Type VIIC submarines
1942 ships
U-boats commissioned in 1942
U-boats sunk in 1945
World War II shipwrecks in the Atlantic Ocean
World War II submarines of Germany
Ships built in Hamburg
Operation Deadlight
Maritime incidents in December 1945